The State of Somaliland was a short-lived independent country in the territory of present-day unilaterally declared Republic of Somaliland. It existed on the territory of former British Somaliland for five days between 26 June 1960 and 1 July 1960, when it merged with the formerly Italian administered Trust Territory of Somaliland to form the Somali Republic.

History

Initially the British government planned to delay protectorate of British Somaliland independence in favour of a gradual transfer of power. The arrangement would allow local politicians to gain more political experience in running the protectorate before official independence. However, strong pan Somali nationalism and a landslide victory in the earlier elections encouraged them to demand independence and unification with the Trust Territory of Somaliland under Italian Administration(the former Italian Somaliland).

The British stated that it would be prepared to grant independence to the then protectorate of British Somaliland, with the intention that the territory would unite with the Trust Territory of Somaliland. The Legislative Council of British Somaliland passed a resolution in April 1960 requesting independence and union with the Trust Territory of Somaliland, which was scheduled to gain independence on 1 July that year. The legislative councils of both territories agreed to this proposal following a joint conference in Mogadishu.

Muhammad Haji Ibrahim Egal, who had previously served as an unofficial member of the former British Somaliland protectorate's Executive Council and the Leader of Government Business in the Legislative Council, became the Prime Minister of the State of Somaliland.

On 26 June 1960, the former British Somaliland protectorate obtained independence as the State of Somaliland, with the Trust Territory of Somaliland following suit five days later. The following day, on 27 June 1960, the newly convened Somaliland Legislative Assembly approved a bill that would formally allow for the union of the State of Somaliland with the Trust Territory of Somaliland on 1 July 1960.

During its brief existence, the State of Somaliland received international recognition from 35 countries, that included China, Egypt, Ethiopia, France, Ghana, Israel, Libya and the Soviet Union. The United States Secretary of State Christian Herter sent a congratulatory message, and the United Kingdom signed several bilateral agreements with Somaliland in Hargeisa on June 26, 1960. 
This a copy of the letter that Secretary of State Christian Herter sent 
And here is the letter that Elizabeth II send to the people of Somaliland in the independence day .

There were also fears of clashes with populations in Ethiopia.

On July 1, 1960, five days after the former British Somaliland protectorate obtained independence as the State of Somaliland, the territory united as scheduled with the Trust Territory of Somaliland to form the Somali Republic (Somalia).

A government was formed by Abdullahi Issa, with Abdulcadir Muhammed Aden as President of the Somali National Assembly, Aden Abdullah Osman Daar as President and Abdirashid Ali Shermarke as Prime Minister, later to become President (from 1967–1969). On July 20, 1961, and through a popular referendum, the Somali people ratified a new constitution, which was first drafted in 1960. The constitution was widely regarded as unfair in the former Somaliland, however, and over 60% of the northern voters were against it in the referendum. Regardless, it was signed into law. Widespread dissatisfaction spread among the north's population, and British-trained officers attempted a revolt to end the union in December 1961. Their uprising failed, and Somaliland continued to be marginalized by the south during the next decades.

Use of state as a precedent for Somaliland
Today's self-proclaimed Republic of Somaliland functions as a de facto independent state that claims to be the legal successor to the State of Somaliland. However, unlike the former State of Somaliland, it is not internationally recognised as a country, instead being treated officially as an autonomous region within Somalia.

References

Works cited

External links
 The Somali Republic: an experiment in legal integration by Paolo Contini—leader of the UN Consultative Commission for Integration, which oversaw the union of the former State of Somaliland and the Trust Territory of Somaliland.
Constitution

States and territories established in 1960